John Richard Attlee, 3rd Earl Attlee (born 3 October 1956), styled Viscount Prestwood between 1967 and 1991, is a British Conservative Party peer and member of the House of Lords. He is the grandson of Clement Attlee, the Labour Prime Minister, who was the first Earl Attlee.

Early life
Attlee was educated at Stowe School, trained with Smiths Industries, and worked mainly in materials management.

Professional career
In 1985, Attlee went into business in the field of commercial vehicle recovery and repair. In this connection he is president of the Heavy Transport Association and Patron of the Road Rescue Recovery Association.

He undertook a tour with the non-governmental organisation British Direct Aid in Bosnia during the winter of 1993–94, and then ran British Direct Aid's operation in Rwanda for most of 1995.

Military service
A member of the Territorial Army, Attlee served in Bosnia with an aid agency during 1993–1994. He has also served in the Gulf War.

Political career
Attlee inherited his title following his father's death in 1991 and entered the House of Lords in 1992, initially as a crossbencher. Shortly before the general election of 1997 he joined the Conservative Party. He is one of the ninety elected hereditary peers that remain in the House of Lords after the passing of the House of Lords Act 1999.

He served as an Opposition spokesman on various subjects; immediately prior to the 2010 general election he was spokesman for transport and an Opposition whip. Following the Conservative victory in that election Earl Attlee was appointed a Lord-in-waiting or Government whip in the House of Lords. He continued in that role until April 2014, when he left the government. He was replaced by Susan Williams, Baroness Williams of Trafford.

Personal life
Earl Attlee married Teresa Ahern on 27 September 2008, in the Crypt Chapel of St Mary Undercroft, Palace of Westminster. Lady Attlee is the younger daughter of Mortimer Ahern, of Malvern, Worcestershire. Should Lord Attlee die without a son, the earldom will become extinct.

Arms

References

External links

1956 births
Living people
People educated at Stowe School
John
Conservative Party (UK) hereditary peers

Hereditary peers elected under the House of Lords Act 1999